The Billboard Hot 100 is a chart that ranks the best-performing singles of the United States. Published by Billboard magazine, the data are compiled by Nielsen SoundScan based collectively on each single's weekly physical and digital sales, and airplay. There were a total of 12 number-one singles in 2009, although 13 claimed the top spot as Beyoncé's "Single Ladies (Put a Ring on It)" reached its peak position in 2008, and thus is excluded.

In 2009, six acts achieved their first U.S. number-one single either as a lead artist or a featured guest: Lady Gaga, Colby O'Donis The Black Eyed Peas, Jay Sean, Jason Derulo, and Owl City. Jay-Z earned his first number-one single as a lead artist (with Alicia Keys) with "Empire State of Mind", after being the featured guest on three number-one singles. Lady Gaga and Black Eyed Peas each earned two number-one singles.

Black Eyed Peas broke the record for having spent the most consecutive weeks at number one (26 weeks consecutive weeks at the top) with "I Gotta Feeling" the longest-running number-one single of 2009 and of the 2000s (decade) (fourteen weeks), along with the non-consecutive Mariah Carey's "We Belong Together" in 2005, and their first number-one single "Boom Boom Pow", which topped the chart for twelve weeks.

Notable highlights of the 2009 Billboard Hot 100 issues include Kelly Clarkson's "My Life Would Suck Without You", which broke the record for the biggest leap to number one by jumping from number 97 to the number-one position. Britney Spears's "3" became the only non-'American Idol' song to debut at number one in the 2000s (decade).

Chart history

Number-one artists

See also
2009 in music
List of Billboard 200 number-one albums of 2009
List of Billboard Hot 100 top 10 singles in 2009
Billboard Year-End Hot 100 singles of 2009
List of Billboard number-one singles

References

Additional sources
Fred Bronson's Billboard Book of Number 1 Hits, 5th Edition
Joel Whitburn's Top Pop Singles 1955-2008, 12 Edition
Joel Whitburn Presents the Billboard Hot 100 Charts: The 2000s
Additional information obtained can be verified within Billboard's online archive services and print editions of the magazine.

United States Hot 100
2009
Hot 100 number-one singles